The 2020 Nicholls State Colonels football team represented Nicholls State University as a member of the Southland Conference during the 2020–21 NCAA Division I FCS football season. Led by sixth-year head coach Tim Rebowe, the Colonels compiled an overall record of 4–3 with a mark of 3–3 in conference play, tying for third place in the Southland. Nicholls State played home games at John L. Guidry Stadium in Thibodaux, Louisiana.

Shortly before the season was to commence, the Southland Conference canceled their fall sports, with the hope that all sports would be playable in Spring 2021. The Colonels started their spring season on February 19, 2021.

Previous season
The Colonels finished the 2019 season 9–5, 7–2 in Southland play to finish tied for first in the Southland Conference, along with Central Arkansas. The Colonels received an automatic bid to the postseason tournament following their conference championship. The Colonels defeated North Dakota in the First Round 24-6 before ultimately losing to North Dakota State in the Second Round by the score of 37–13.

Preseason

Recruiting class
Reference(s):

|}

Preseason poll
The Southland Conference released their spring preseason poll in January 2021. The Colonels were picked to finish first in the conference. In addition, eight Colonels were chosen to the Preseason All-Southland Team

Preseason All–Southland Teams

Offense

1st Team
Julien Gums – Running Back, JR
Dai'Jean Dixon – Wide Receiver, SR
P. J. Burkhalter – Offensive Lineman, RS-SR
Jair Joseph – Offensive Lineman, SR

2nd Team
Mikhail Hill – Offensive Lineman, RS-JR
Jeremiah James – Offensive Lineman, RS-SO

Defense

1st Team
Kevin Moore III – Defensive Back, SR

2nd Team
Evan Veron – Linebacker, SR

Schedule

Game summaries

Lincoln

Lamar

at Northwestern State

at Sam Houston State

Incarnate Word

at McNeese State

Southeastern Louisiana

References

Nicholls
Nicholls Colonels football seasons
Nicholls Colonels football